John Astor (26 September 1923 – 27 December 1987) was a British Conservative politician.

Early life
John was the youngest of three sons born to John Jacob Astor V, 1st Baron Astor of Hever (1886–1971) and Lady Violet Mary Elliot-Murray-Kynynmound (1889–1965).  He had two elder brothers, Gavin Astor, who inherited his father's barony, and Hugh Astor.  His mother had two children, Mary Petty-Fitzmaurice, and George Petty-Fitzmaurice, from her first marriage to Lord Charles Petty-Fitzmaurice who was killed in action at Ypres.  His elder half-brother George later became the 8th Marquess of Lansdowne

His paternal grandparents were American born William Waldorf Astor, 1st Viscount Astor, and his wife, Mary Dahlgren Paul. His maternal grandparents were Gilbert Elliot-Murray-Kynynmound, 4th Earl of Minto and his wife Lady Mary Caroline Grey.

He was educated at Summerfields and Eton College.

Career
During World War II he served in the Royal Air Force Volunteer Reserve. He was a Berkshire County Councillor from 1953 and an alderman from 1960.

Astor was elected as a Conservative MP for Newbury in the 1964 general election. He was re-elected twice, in 1966 and 1970, but stood down before the first February 1974 general election. In 1970, he was appointed to the position of Parliamentary Private Secretary to the Minister of Overseas Development.

Personal life
In 1950, he married Diana Kathleen Drummond (1926–1982), a daughter of George Henry Drummond and Helena Kathleen Holt. Helena was a niece of civil engineer Herbert Samuel Holt. They had three children, two sons and a daughter, including:

 Elizabeth Kathleen Astor (born 1951)
 John Richard Astor (1953–2016), who married Katherine Mary Darell in 1977.
 George David Astor (born 1958), who married Marianne Julia Piroska Leche (1958-2019) in 1983.

In 1982, he married Penelope Eve Bradford (d. 2006). They had no children and lived at Kirby House, Inkpen, Berkshire.

Astor died at Kirby House in Berkshire on 27 December 1987.  Penelope died on 31 December 2006.

References

External links
 
 

1923 births
1987 deaths
John
English people of American descent
English people of German descent
English people of Irish descent
English people of Scottish descent
Conservative Party (UK) MPs for English constituencies
Councillors in Berkshire
Newbury, Berkshire
People educated at Eton College
Royal Air Force Volunteer Reserve personnel of World War II
UK MPs 1964–1966
UK MPs 1966–1970
UK MPs 1970–1974
Younger sons of barons
Livingston family